Region II (Spanish: Región 2. Atlacomulco) is an intrastate region within the State of Mexico, one of 16.  It borders the states of Querétaro Hidalgo and Michoacán in the northwest corner of the state.  The region comprises sixteen municipalities: Acambay, Aculco, Atlacomulco, Ixtlahuaca, Jocotitlán, Timilpan.  It is largely rural.

Municipalities 
Acambay
Aculco
Atlacomulco
Jilotepec
Jocotitlán
Polotitlán
San Felipe del Progreso
Timilpan

References

Regions of the State of Mexico